Kofi Asare was a Ghanaian medical doctor and politician. He was the Regional Director of Ghana Health Service in Central Region, Cape Coast. He also served as the Member of Parliament for the Akwatia constituency in the Eastern Region.

Early life and education 
Asare was born on December 12, 1954, at Akyem-Wenchi in Eastern Region. He obtained a Master of Science degree in Public Health at the University of London in 1993.

Politics 
Asare was a member of the Fifth Parliament of the Fourth Republic of Ghana. Running on the New Patriotic Party (NPP) ticket in the 2008 general elections, Asare defeated Ahmed Mohammed Baba-Jamal of the National Democratic Congress and three others to win the Akwatia parliamentary seat. The one-term MP polled 17,900 votes to defeat Mr Baba-Jamal who polled 15,860 in the elections. Asare lost the seat four years later in the 2012 Ghanaian General elections to Mr Baba Jamal after he was defeated in the NPP primaries by Madam Mercy Adu-Gyamfi.

Personal life 
Asare was a Presbyterian, married with four children.

Death 
He died in a car accident on the Nkawkaw-Accra highway on 21 February 2017 at the age of 62.

References 

1954 births
2017 deaths
Ghanaian MPs 2009–2013
Ghanaian public health doctors
Ghanaian Presbyterians
New Patriotic Party politicians